Jopen is a beer brewery from Haarlem, Netherlands. Jopen's beer is a result of the work of Stichting Haarlems Biergenootschap, which was founded in 1992. The mission of the Biergenootschap is to re-create traditional Haarlem beers and bring them to the commercial market. Two recipes were found in the Haarlem city archives that were used as a foundation for two initial beers. The first one was a recipe from 1407; the recreation of this was named Koyt, a gruit beer.

In December 1996, the commercial company Jopen BV acquired the beer. The name Jopen refers to the 112 litre beer barrels that were used in early times to transport the Haarlem beer. Until the end of 1996 Jopen beer was brewed in the Halve Maan brewery in Hulst, after that it was made in the La Trappe brewery in Berkel-Enschot. Since 2001, the Jopen beer brands were brewed in Ertvelde, Belgium, in brewery Van Steenberge. The current brewer is Chris Wisse. At the end of 2005, it was announced that the old Jacobskerk, in the Raaks area in the city centre of Haarlem, would be transformed into a brewery. On November 11, 2010, the "Jopenkerk" (Jopen church) opened its doors for the public. Besides the brewery it also hosts a café and restaurant. Jopen won two silver medals at the 2008 World Beer Championship.

Beers
Jopen Hoppen (Historical hopped beer (recipe from 1501), 6.8% ABV)
Jopen Koyt (Historical beer with Gruit (recipe from 1407), 8.5% ABV)
Adriaan (Wheat beer, 5.0% ABV)
4 Granen Bok (Autumn bock made from 4 types of grain, 6.5% ABV)
Lentebier (Springtime beer, 7.0% ABV)
Extra Stout (Stout, 5.5% ABV)
Gerstebier (Blond beer, 4.5% ABV)
Johannieter (Double bock, 9.0% ABV)
Trinitas Tripel (Tripel, 9.0% ABV)
Ongelovige Thomas (Imperial Quadrupel, 10.0% ABV)
Jacobus RPA (Rye pale ale, 5.3% ABV)

References

External links
Official website (in Dutch)
Jopen beers on Ratebeer.com
Jopen beers on Beeradvocate.com

Beer in the Netherlands
Haarlem